Dawn Martin represented Ireland in the 1998 Eurovision Song Contest with the song "Is Always Over Now?".

Before Eurovision

Eurosong 1998 
Eurosong 1998 was the national final format developed by RTÉ in order to select Ireland's entry for the Eurovision Song Contest 1998. The competition was held at the RTÉ Television Centre in Dublin on 8 March 1998 and hosted by Pat Kenny. 400 entries were submitted for the competition and eight artists and songs were selected to compete. Votes from ten regional juries determined the winner and after the combination of votes, "Is Always Over Now?" performed by Dawn Martin was selected as the winner.

At Eurovision 
Dawn performed 13th in the running order on the night of the contest. Paul Harrington, who won the contest for Ireland in 1994, performed backing vocals. "Is Always Over Now?" went on to place 9th with 64 points.

Voting

References

1998
Countries in the Eurovision Song Contest 1998
Eurovision
Eurovision